The Bayer designation Nu Canis Majoris (ν CMa / ν Canis Majoris) is shared by three star systems, in the constellation Canis Major:
 ν1 Canis Majoris
 ν2 Canis Majoris
 ν3 Canis Majoris

They are separated by the different asterism in Chinese astronomy. ν1 Canis Majoris was not any member of asterism. ν2 Canis Majoris was stand alone in asterism 野雞 (Yě Jī), Wild Cockerel. ν3 Canis Majoris was member of asterism 軍市 (Jūn Shì), Market for Soldiers. Both of asterisms were lied in Well mansion.

References

Canis Major
Canis Majoris, Nu